The 1996–1997 season was the 118th season in Bolton Wanderers F.C.'s existence, and their first season back in the Football League First Division after relegation from the Premier League. It covers the period from 1 July 1996 to 30 June 1997. After 102 years, this was the club's last season at Burnden Park.

Results

Nationwide League Division One

F.A. Cup

Coca-Cola Cup

Transfers

Transfers in

Transfers out

Loans in

Loans out

Appearances
Bolton used a total of 22 players during the season.

Top scorers

References

 

1996-97
Bol